Luciobarbus bocagei is a ray-finned fish species in the family Cyprinidae. Its scientific name honours the Portuguese zoologist and politician Jose Vicente Barboza du Bocage. It is here placed in Luciobarbus following the IUCN, but that genus is very closely related to the other typical barbels and perhaps better considered a mere subgenus of Barbus. The  Ebro barbel (L. graellsii) and Andalusian barbel (L. sclateri) were formerly included in L. bocagei as subspecies.

Natural hybrids of this barbel and the closely related Iberian Barbel (L. comizo, a threatened species) are not uncommon in the middle Tagus river. The two species and their hybrids are hard to distinguish, but L. bocagei has a shorter and wider head, and the last unbranched ray of the dorsal fin has a shorter denticulated section but with more densely packed denticles. In the first two traits the hybrids are intermediate between their parent species, in the latter they are closer to L. comizo. Also, the two species are distinguished by their microhabitat preferences where they are sympatric, with L. comizo inhabiting almost stagnant parts of the river. The hybridisation confounds phylogenetic studies based only on mtDNA.

L. bocagei is endemic to the Atlantic part Iberian Peninsula, where it occurs in both Portugal and Spain. It inhabits the slow-moving middle and lower parts of rivers, between the Limia/Lima's and the Sado Rivers' drainage basins (i.e. including the Douro and Tagus for example). Though its range is not particularly large, L. bocagei is quite abundant and not considered a threatened species by the IUCN.

It eats mainly benthic invertebrates and detritus. They spawn in late spring to early summer (May to June) in faster-moving water than they normally inhabit. This is a long-lived species, with a maximum age of 14 years having been recorded.

See also
 Barbus haasi, a related species endemic to Bages comarca in Catalonia.

Footnotes

References
  (2008): Natural hybridization of Barbus bocagei x Barbus comizo (Cyprinidae) in Tagus River basin, central Spain [English with French abstract]. Cybium 32(2): 99-102. PDF fulltext
  (2007): Evolutionary origin of Lake Tana's (Ethiopia) small Barbus species: indications of rapid ecological divergence and speciation. Anim. Biol. 57(1): 39-48.  (HTML abstract)

Bocagei
Freshwater fish of Europe
Endemic fish of the Iberian Peninsula
Taxa named by Franz Steindachner
Fish described in 1864
Taxonomy articles created by Polbot